Ödön Nádas (12 September 1891 – 9 October 1951) was a Hungarian football trainer, who coached Hungary in the 1934 FIFA World Cup.

References

1891 births
1951 deaths
Footballers from Budapest
Hungarian footballers
Hungarian football managers
Hungary national football team managers
1934 FIFA World Cup managers
Association footballers not categorized by position